The Jackson County Courthouse is located along Main Street (Arkansas Highway 367) in the center of Newport, Arkansas, the county seat of Jackson County.  It is a Late Victorian brick building, with a protruding three-story square tower.  It was built in 1892, and is one of the state's oldest courthouses.  It was apparently based in part on the Ouachita County courthouse (since demolished), but its architect is not known.

The building was listed on the National Register of Historic Places in 1976.

See also
National Register of Historic Places listings in Jackson County, Arkansas

References

Courthouses on the National Register of Historic Places in Arkansas
County courthouses in Arkansas
Buildings and structures in Jackson County, Arkansas
Government buildings completed in 1892
National Register of Historic Places in Jackson County, Arkansas
1892 establishments in Arkansas
Newport, Arkansas